Rapid City, South Dakota was founded in 1876 and was run by a village board of trustees until 1882, when John Richard Brennan, a member of the board and cofounder of the city, was chosen as mayor. Two months after the city was incorporated, Fred E. Stearns was elected mayor. The first form of elected government was mayor–council with an elected strong mayor. From 1910 to 1922, a city commission government was used. Later that year, the system of government was changed to council–manager. Rapid City returned to a mayor–council government in 1957. The Rapid City Council chose to extend the mayoral term to four years in 2015, and the change took effect in 2019. There is no term limit. The annual mayoral salary is $95,406.

List

References

Rapid City